Laird Samuel Barron (born 5 March 1970) is an American author and poet, much of whose work falls within the horror, noir, and dark fantasy genres.  He has also been the managing editor of the online literary magazine Melic Review. He lives in Upstate New York.

Early life
Barron spent his early years in Alaska. He has described his youth as exceedingly harsh because his family was poor and lived in isolated areas.

Career
In Alaska, Barron raced the Iditarod three times during the early 1990s, and worked as a fisherman on the Bering Sea.

He retired from racing and moved to Washington in 1994. He became active on the poetry scene, publishing with a number of online journals and eventually serving as the managing editor of the Melic Review. His professional writing debut occurred in 2001 when Gordon Van Gelder published Shiva, Open Your Eye in the September issue of The Magazine of Fantasy & Science Fiction. Barron's debut collection, The Imago Sequence & Other Stories, was published in 2007 by Night Shade Books.

He has stated his affection for pulp fiction, westerns, and noir, and his work typically combines one or more of these elements with a horrific or weird supernatural intrusion. Barron has referred to the Bible and the Necronomicon as "the greatest horror stories ever told."

In addition to The Magazine of Fantasy & Science Fiction, Barron's work has been featured in SCI FICTION, Inferno: New Tales of Terror and the Supernatural, Lovecraft Unbound, Black Wings: New Tales of Lovecraftian Horror, and The Del Rey Book of Science Fiction and Fantasy. It has also been reprinted in numerous year's best anthologies and nominated for multiple awards.

He was a 2007 and 2010 Shirley Jackson Award winner for his collections The Imago Sequence and Other Stories and Occultation and Other Stories. "Mysterium Tremendum"  won a 2010 Shirley Jackson Award for best novella. He is also a 2009 nominee for his novelette "Catch Hell"  Other award nominations include the Crawford Award, Sturgeon Award, International Horror Guild Award, World Fantasy Award, Bram Stoker Award and the Locus Award.

His second novel, The Croning, was published in 2012 by Night Shade Books. His next three novels were published by G.P. Putnam's Sons.

Bibliography

Novels
The Light is the Darkness, Bloodletting Press 2011
The Croning, Night Shade Books 2012
Blood Standard, G.P. Putnam's Sons 2018
Black Mountain, G.P. Putnam's Sons 2019
Worse Angels, G.P. Putnam's Sons 2020

Collections
 The Imago Sequence & Other Stories, Night Shade Books 2007; Trade paperback 2009
 Occultation, Night Shade Books 2010 Shirley Jackson Award. Best Collection.
 The Beautiful Thing That Awaits Us All, Night Shade Books 2013
A Little Brown Book of Burials Borderlands Press 2015
Swift to Chase JournalStone 2016

Anthologies
The Year's Best Fantasy & Horror 17 St Martin's 2004
The Year's Best Fantasy & Horror 18 St Martin's 2005
The Three-Lobed Burning Eye Annual Volume No. 2 Legion Press 2005
Trochu divné kusy 2 2006
Fantastyka Number 4 2006
The Year's Best Fantasy & Horror 19 St. Martin's 2006
Horror: Best of 2005 Prime 2006
Fantasy: Best of 2005 Prime 2006
Year's Best Fantasy 6 Tachyon 2006
Inferno Tor 2007
Year's Best Fantasy 7 Tachyon 2007
The Year's Best Fantasy & Horror 21 2008
Clockwork Phoenix Norilana Press 2008
Year's Best Fantasy 8 Tachyon 2008
The Del Rey Book of Science Fiction & Fantasy Del Rey 2008
Jack Haringa Must Die! 2008
Lovecraft Unbound Dark Horse Comics 2009
The Best Horror of the Year 1 Night Shade Books 2009
Poe Solaris 2009
Wilde Stories 2010 Lethe 2010
Haunted Legends Tor Books 2010
Cthulhu's Reign DAW Books 2010
The Best Horror of the Year 2 Night Shade Books 2010
Black Wings PS Publishing 2010
The Year's Best Dark Fantasy & Horror 2011 ed Prime 2011
The Book of Cthulhu Night Shade Books 2011
Blood & Other Cravings Tor 2011
Ghosts by Gaslight HarperCollins 2011
Supernatural Noir Dark Horse 2011
The Best Horror of the Year 3 Night Shade Books 2011
New Cthulhu Prime Books 2011
Creatures Prime Books 2011
Wilde Stories 2011 Lethe 2011
Dark Faith 2 Apex Books 2012
Heiresses of Russ Lethe 2012
Ghosts: Recent Hauntings Prime Books 2012
A Season in Carcosa Miskatonic River Press 2012
The Book of Cthulhu 2 Night Shade Books 2012
Fungi Innsmouth Free Press 2012
The Best Horror of the Year 4 Night Shade Books 2012
Horror For Good: A Charitable Anthology (Volume 1) Cutting Block Press 2012
Tales of Jack the Ripper Word Horde 2013
Suffered from the Night Lethe Press 2013
Blood Type: An Anthology of Vampire SF on the Cutting Edge Nightscape Press 2013
Shades of Blue & Gray Prime Books 2013
The Best Horror of the Year 5 Night Shade Books 2013
The Year's Best Dark Fantasy & Horror 2012 ed Prime Books 2013
The Mad Scientist's Guide to World Domination 2013
Nightmare Carnival Dark Horse 2014
Fearful Symmetries Chizine Publications 2014
A Mountain Walked Centipede Press 2014
Gigantic Worlds Gigantic 2014
Lovecraft's Monsters Tachyon 2014
The Cutting Room Tachyon 2014
The Year's Best Dark Fantasy & Horror 2013 edition Prime Books 2014
The Best Horror of the Year 6 Night Shade Books 2014

Stories
"Hour of the Cyclops," Three-Lobed Burning Eye 2000
"Shiva, Open Your Eye," The Magazine of Fantasy & Science Fiction 2001
"Old Virginia," The Magazine of Fantasy & Science Fiction 2003
"Bulldozer," SCI FICTION 2004
"Parallax," SCI FICTION 2005
The Imago Sequence, The Magazine of Fantasy & Science Fiction 2005
"Proboscis," The Magazine of Fantasy & Science Fiction 2005
"The Royal Zoo is Closed," Phantom # Zero 2006
Hallucigenia, The Magazine of Fantasy & Science Fiction 2006
"The Forest," Inferno 2007
Procession of the Black Sloth, The Imago Sequence & Other Stories 2007
"The Lonely Death of Agent Haringa," Kill Jack Haringa 2008
"Occultation," Clockwork Phoenix 2008
"The Lagerstätte," Del Rey Book of Science Fiction & Fantasy 2008
"Catch Hell," Lovecraft Unbound 2009
"Strappado," Poe 2009The Broadsword, Black Wings 2010
"Six Six Six," Occultation 2010
Mysterium Tremendum, Occultation 2010
"--30--," Occultation 2010
"Vastation," Cthulhu's Reign 2010
"The Redfield Girls," Haunted Legends 2010
"The Men from Porlock," The Book of Cthulhu (Night Shade Books) 2011
"The Carrion Gods in Their Heaven" Supernatural Noir 2011
"The Siphon," Blood & Other Cravings 2011
"Blackwood's Baby," Ghosts by Gaslight 2011
"a strange form of life" Dark Faith 2 2012
"More Dark" The Revelator 2012
"Frontier Death Song" Nightmare Magazine 2012
Hand of Glory The Book of Cthulhu 2 2012
"D T," A Season in Carcosa 2012
"Gamma," Fungi 2012
"The Beatification of Custer Poe" Shades of Blue & Gray 2013
"Ardor" Suffered from the Night 2013
"Black Dog" Halloween: Mystery, Magic & the Macabre 2013
"Slave Arm" Blood Type: An Anthology of Vampire SF on the Cutting Edge 2013
"Nemesis" Primeval 2013
"Termination Dust" Tales of Jack the Ripper 2013
"LD50" Weaponized 2013
"Blood & Stardust" The Mad Scientist's Guide to World Domination 2013
"Jaws of Saturn" The beautiful Thing That Awaits Us All 2013
Man with No Name A Mountain Walked 2014
"Screaming Elk, MT" Nightmare Carnival 2014
"Rex" Gigantic Worlds 2014
"the worms crawl in," Fearful Symmetries 2014
X's for Eyes JournalStone novella 2015
"Rex" Gigantic Worlds 2015
"The Cyclorama" Licence Expired 2015
"The Blood in My Mouth" The Madness of Cthulhu 2015
"Strident Caller" Whispers from the Abyss 2 2015
"49 Foot Woman Straps it On" Protectors 2 2015
"Fear Sun" Innsmouth Nightmares 2015
"We Smoke the Northern Lights" The Gods of H.P. Lovecraft 2015
"In a Cavern, in a Canyon" Seize the Night 2015
"Don't Make Me Assume My Ultimate Form" Cthulhu Fhtagn! 2015
"Ears Prick Up" SQ Mag Edition 18 2015
Tomahawk Park Survivors Raffle Swift to Chase 2016
An Atlatl Limbus III 2016
"Mobility" What the #%@!is That? 2016
"Andy Kaufman Creeping through the Trees" Autumn Cthulhu 2016
"Oblivion Mode" Lovecraft's Children 2016
"A Clutch" The Mammoth Book of Cthulhu 2016
Man with No Name JournalStone novella 2016
"Swift to Chase" Adam's Ladder 2017
"Girls without their Faces On" Ashes and Entropy 2018
"We Used Swords in the '70s" Weird Fiction Review 9, 2019
“The One We Tell Bad Children” Final Cuts 2020
“Ode to Joad the Toad” Miscreations: Gods, Monsters, & Other Horrors 2020
“Jōren Falls” Come Join Us by the Fire II 2020
“Tiptoe” When Things Get Dark 2021
“American Remake of a Japanese Ghost Story” There is No Death, and There are No Dead 2021 
“Uncoiling” Cosmic Horror Monthly, January Issue 2022
“The Big Whimper” Weird World War IV 2022
“Bitten by Himself” Screams from the Dark 2022
“So Easy to Kill” Isolation: The Horror Anthology 2022

Other writing
"Twenty-First Century Ghosts." Essay for Locus, May 2007
"Quietly, Now." Essay for Erobos: The New Darkness #1, Summer 2007
"Dark Star: The Michael Shea Experience." An introduction to The Autopsy & Other Tales, Centipede Press, 2008
"Vistas of Evil Splendor." Introduction to The Darkly Splendid Realm by Richard Gavin Dark Regions Press 2009
"Calling into the Darkness." Publishers Weekly essay 2010
"Heart of the North." Introduction to Ballad of the Northland by Jason Barron 2010
"Death's Head Blues." Introduction to Sin & ashes by Joseph S. Pulver Hippocampus 2010
"No Escape." Introduction to The Ones that Got Away by Stephen Graham Jones Prime Books 2010
"Stalking Through the Jungles of Night." Afterword to limited edition of Peter Straub's Koko Centipede Press 2010
"In the Shadows of the Pines." Afterword to The Collected Stories of Karl Edward Wagner by Centipede Press 2011
"Beyond Love, Sex, and the Heat Death of the Universe." Introduction to Engines of Desire, by Livia Llewellyn 2011
"Babes in the Wilderness." Essay for Nightmare Magazine 2013
"May Bury You." Essay for Weird Fiction Review 2014
"A Stitch in Darkness." Introduction to Unseaming by Mike Allen 2014
"Dig My Grave." Introduction to Burnt Black Suns by Simon Strantzas 2014
"Waking the Titans." Introduction to Ana Kai Tangata by Scott Nicolay 2014
"Shine On, Dark Star." Michael Shea tribute for Locus 2014
"No Form Is Eternal." Michael Shea tribute for Lightspeed Magazine 2014
"Eye of the Raven." Foreword for The New Black 2014
"Diabolus Knocks." Foreword to The Case Against Satan Ray Russell, Penguin Classics edition 2015

Adaptations

His story "-30-" was adapted into the 2018 film They Remain starring William Jackson Harper.

References
 Biographical notes at Melic Review, Eclectica magazine, and Sci Fiction

External links

 
 Melic Review
 
 Laird Barron (ology) website and Laird Barron (ology) book 

 Slate Review 

1970 births
21st-century American novelists
American horror writers
American fantasy writers
American crime fiction writers
American male novelists
American male short story writers
Weird fiction writers
Dog mushers from Alaska
Living people
People from Palmer, Alaska
Poets from Alaska
Writers from Olympia, Washington
21st-century American short story writers
21st-century American male writers
Novelists from Washington (state)
21st-century American poets